Jiang Xinyu and Tang Qianhui were the defending champions and successfully defended their title, defeating Lu Jingjing and You Xiaodi in the final, 6–4, 6–4.

Seeds

Draw

Draw

References
Main Draw

Jiangxi International Women's Tennis Open - Doubles
Jiangxi International Women's Tennis Open